Lebanon High School is a high school located in Lebanon, Tennessee. It is a Grade 9-12 school that is part of the Wilson County School System.

History
Lebanon High School located in Lebanon, Tennessee was founded in the year 1918.  It’s mascot is the Blue Devil. It’s school newspaper is The Devil’s Advocate.

2022-2023 Administration
Principal - Dr. Scott Walters
Assistant Principal - Barbara Hallums
Assistant Principal - Selene Tinsley 
Assistant Principal - Eric Spear 
Assistant Principal - David Sheely

State athletic success

Notable alumni
John Ray Clemmons (born 1977), member of the Tennessee House of Representatives, representing the 55th district, in West Nashville.
Edward Daniel Smith (born 1992), graduate of Columbia Law School, Assistant District Attorney for the office of the New York County District Attorney in New York City.

References

External links
 School website

Public high schools in Tennessee
Lebanon, Tennessee
Schools in Wilson County, Tennessee